Jane Shore is a 1915 British silent historical film directed by Bert Haldane and F. Martin Thornton and starring Blanche Forsythe, Roy Travers and Robert Purdie. It is an adaptation of the 1714 play The Tragedy of Jane Shore by Nicholas Rowe and is based on the life of Jane Shore, the mistress of Edward IV.

Cast
 Blanche Forsythe - Jane Winstead
 Roy Travers - Edward IV
 Robert Purdie - Matthew Shore
 Thomas H. MacDonald - Lord Hastings
 Dora De Winton - Margaret
 Maud Yates - Queen Elizabeth
 Nelson Phillips - William Shore
 Rolf Leslie - Duke of Gloucester
 Tom Coventry - Master Winstead
 Rachel de Solla - Dame Winstead
 Frank Melrose - Garth the Bard
 Fred Pitt - Warwick

References

External links

1915 films
British silent feature films
1910s English-language films
Films directed by Bert Haldane
Films directed by Floyd Martin Thornton
1910s historical drama films
British historical drama films
Films set in England
Films set in London
British black-and-white films
1915 drama films
1910s British films
Silent historical drama films